Death by China: Confronting the Dragon – A Global Call to Action is a 2011 non-fiction book by Peter Navarro and Greg Autry that chronicles ("from currency manipulation and abusive trade policies, to deadly consumer products") the alleged threats to America's economic dominance in the 21st century posed by China's Communist Party.

A feature-length documentary film based on the book, narrated by Martin Sheen and also titled Death by China, was released in 2012.

Themes and content
Navarro argues that China violates fair trade by "illegal export subsidies and currency manipulation, effectively flooding the U.S. markets" and unfairly making it "virtually impossible" for American companies to compete. It is a critique of "global capitalism" including foreign labor practices and environmental protection. Currency manipulation and subsidies are stated as reasons that "American companies cannot compete because they're not competing with Chinese companies, they're competing with the Chinese government."

The book's foreword was written by Tang Baiqiao, a student activist during the 1989 Tiananmen Square protests, now resident in the US and a prominent supporter of President Donald Trump.

The book cites a claim by Ron Vara, a purported Harvard economics student, "The Manufacturing Dragon is voracious. The Colonial Dragon is relentless. The American Eagle is asleep at the wheel.", which was later discovered to an invention of Navarro. In response, publisher Prentice Hall stated that a disclaimer will be added to future editions of the book.

Reception
In a 2011 review, Chriss Street of The Huffington Post described the book as "a muckraker's call to confront the dangers of America's dance with the Chinese dragon in the 21st century."

In a 2012 article, Andrew O'Hehir of Salon commented that Navarro's "dramatic overkill is both unfortunate and unnecessary, because the questions Navarro asks about our deformed and dependent relationship with China are legitimate and troubling[,]" and "[m]uch of the argument Navarro assembles in 'Death by China' is unassailable as to its basic facts, even if the tone and manner of presentation leave much to be desired." Similarly, Neil Genzlinger of The New York Times found that the "alarming and alarmist" film "undercuts its argument with an abundance of inflammatory language and cheesy graphics" and "is also unabashedly one-sided and is short on solutions" but added that "its message, despite the hyperbole, certainly warrants examination and discussion."

Reviewing the documentary in 2012, Sam Adams of the Los Angeles Times found that the "important political argument at the core of Peter Navarro's agitprop documentary" was "drowned out by xenophobic hysteria and exaggerations so rampant it becomes impossible to tell light from heat." He concluded by saying "Substituting rhetoric for argument, 'Death by China' doesn't preach to the choir so much as it holds a revival meeting in an empty tent."

Ronnie Scheib, from Variety, says "One need not fully subscribe to Peter Navarro's demonization to appreciate his lucid wake-up call to the imminent dangers of the huge U.S.-China trade imbalance and its disastrous impact on the American economy."

Rotten Tomatoes gives the documentary a score of 33% based on reviews from 12 critics, with an average rating of 5/10. Comments include "It is ... unabashedly one-sided and is short on solutions" (Neil Genzlinger, The New York Times), "[A] rabid piece of agitprop, which swamps a number of legitimate arguments against the current trade arrangement between the U.S. and China with the strident brushstrokes of a bad editorial cartoon" (Scott Tobias, The A.V. Club), and "Angry, fatally biased but watchable documentary ranting at China for its transgressions and damage done to the U.S. economy cries out for second opinions from other corners besides those damning" (Doris Toumarkine, Film Journal International).

References

External links
 
 
 

2011 non-fiction books
American non-fiction books
Books about the People's Republic of China
Documentary films about China
Economic history of the People's Republic of China
Economics books
English-language books
Collaborative non-fiction books
Trade in China
Prentice Hall books